The 2021 North Carolina Tar Heels baseball team represented University of North Carolina, Chapel Hill during the 2021 NCAA Division I baseball season. The Tar Heels played their home games at Boshamer Stadium as a member of the Atlantic Coast Conference. They were led by head coach Scott Forbes, in his first season at North Carolina.

Previous season

The 2020 North Carolina Tar Heels baseball team notched a 12–7 (0–3) regular season record. The season prematurely ended on March 12, 2020 due to concerns over the COVID-19 pandemic.

Game log

References

External links 
 Georgia Tech Baseball 2021 schedule

North Carolina Tar Heels
North Carolina Tar Heels baseball seasons
North Carolina Tar Heels baseball
North Carolina